Alger "Duke" Chapman Jr. was the President and CEO of Shearson, Hammill & Co. and Chairman and CEO of the Chicago Board Options Exchange from 1986 to 1997.

Early life and career
Chapman was born to Alger Baldwin Chapman and the former Elizabeth Libby Ives on September 28, 1931, in Portland, Maine. He graduated from Williams College and Columbia University.

He worked at the Securities and Exchange Commission and then at the New York Stock Exchange, where he was a Vice President.  he then joined Shearson Hammill in 1966.  He rose to become President and CEO of Shearson Hammill, eventually merging the company with Hayden, Stone & Co.  He stayed with the company and its successor.  In 1986, he became Chairman and CEO of the Chicago Board Options Exchange.  After quitting in 1997, Chapman joined ABN Amro where he remained until his retirement in 2004.

References

Columbia Law School alumni
American chief executives of financial services companies
1931 births
2013 deaths
Businesspeople from Portland, Maine
20th-century American businesspeople